Nebria tenella saridaghensis is a subspecies of ground beetle in the Nebriinae subfamily that is endemic to Caucasus.

References

tenella saridaghensis
Beetles described in 1983
Beetles of Asia